Gornje Plavnice  is a village in Croatia.

References 

Populated places in Bjelovar-Bilogora County